FMIC may refer to:
 Front mounted intercooler, a type of intercooler
 Fender Musical Instruments Corporation
 French Medical Institute for Children, Kabul, Afghanistan